Young Mr. Lincoln is a 1939 American biographical drama western film about the early life of President Abraham Lincoln, directed by John Ford and starring Henry Fonda.  Ford and producer Darryl F. Zanuck fought for control of the film, to the point where Ford destroyed unwanted takes for fear the studio would use them in the film. Screenwriter Lamar Trotti was nominated for an Academy Award for Best Writing/Original Story.

In 2003, Young Mr. Lincoln was selected for preservation in the United States National Film Registry by the Library of Congress as being "culturally, historically, or aesthetically significant".

Plot
In 1832, a family traveling through New Salem, Illinois in its wagon need groceries from Lincoln's (Henry Fonda) store, and the only thing of value that they have to trade is a barrel of old books including a law book, Blackstone's Commentaries. After thoroughly reading the book, Lincoln opts for the law after receiving encouragement from his early, ill-fated love, Ann Rutledge (Pauline Moore), who soon dies. Too poor to own even a horse, he arrives in Springfield, Illinois, on a mule and soon establishes a law practice in 1837 with his friend John Stuart (Edwin Maxwell). After a raucous, day-long Independence Day celebration, a man, Skrub White, is killed after he pulled a gun in a fight. The accused are two brothers, Matt and Adam Clay (Richard Cromwell and Eddie Quillan). Lincoln prevents the lynching of the accused at the jail by shaming the angry, drunken mob. He also convinces it that he really needs the clients for his first real case.

Admiring his courage, Mary Todd (Marjorie Weaver) invites Lincoln to her sister's soiree. Despite being aggressively courted by the very polished Stephen Douglas (Milburn Stone), Mary is interested in Lincoln. She faithfully attends the trial of the Clay boys, sits in the front row, and listens closely.

The boys' mother, Abigail Clay (Alice Brady), who witnessed the end of the fight, and Lincoln are pressured by the prosecutor (Donald Meek) to save one of the brothers at the expense of the other's conviction. However, the key witness to the crime, J. Palmer Cass (Ward Bond), is a friend of the victim who claims to have seen the murder at a distance of about 100 yards under the light of the moon: "It was moon bright." However, Lincoln persists and is able, by using an almanac, to demonstrate that on the night in question, the moon had set before the time of death. He then drives Cass to confess that he had actually stabbed his friend.

Cast

 Henry Fonda as Abraham Lincoln
 Alice Brady as Abigail Clay (final film role)
 Marjorie Weaver as Mary Todd
 Arleen Whelan as Sarah Clay
 Eddie Collins as Efe Turner
 Pauline Moore as Ann Rutledge
 Richard Cromwell as Matt Clay
 Donald Meek as Prosecutor John Felder
 Dorris Bowdon as Carrie Sue (Judith Dickens, who was obviously replaced by Bowden, is falsely credited)
 Eddie Quillan as Adam Clay
 Spencer Charters as Judge Herbert A. Bell
 Ward Bond as John Palmer Cass
 Milburn Stone as Stephen A. Douglas
 Cliff Clark as Sheriff Gil Billing
 Fred Kohler Jr. as Skrub White (uncredited)

Background
The film has as its basis the murder case against William "Duff" Armstrong, which took place in 1858 at the courthouse in Beardstown, Illinois, the only courthouse in which Lincoln practiced law that is still in use.

It is referred to as the "Almanac Trial" on Armstrong's grave, and Lincoln proved the witness against the accused was lying about being able to see by the light of the moon, using an almanac. Armstrong was acquitted.

Adaptations
Young Mr. Lincoln was adapted as a radio play on the July 10, 1946, episode of Academy Award Theater.

The Village Theatre of Everett and Issaquah, Washington has commissioned a new musical based on the film titled Lincoln in Love, book and lyrics by Peter S. Kellogg and music by David Friedman.

See also
 List of American films of 1939
 List of films with a 100% rating on Rotten Tomatoes, a film review aggregator website

References

External links

 
 
 
 
 
Young Mr. Lincoln: Hero in Waiting an essay by Geoffrey O'Brien at the Criterion Collection

1939 films
1930s biographical drama films
1930s English-language films
1930s historical drama films
1939 Western (genre) films
American Western (genre) films
20th Century Fox films
American biographical drama films
American black-and-white films
American courtroom films
American historical drama films
Films about Abraham Lincoln
Fictional depictions of Abraham Lincoln in film
Films about lawyers
Films about presidents of the United States
Films directed by John Ford
Films scored by Alfred Newman
Films scored by Louis Silvers
Films set in Illinois
Films set in the 1830s
Films with screenplays by Lamar Trotti
United States National Film Registry films
1930s American films